Air Transport International, Inc. is an airline based in Wilmington, Ohio, United States. It operates worldwide cargo charters and combi charters for the express package industry and freight forwarders, as well as for the United States Department of Defense. It also wet-leases aircraft. Its main base is Wilmington. It is part of the Air Transport Services Group.

History 
The airline was established in 1978 and started operations in 1979. It was formed as US Airways and later known as Interstate Airlines. The current name was adopted in 1988. On October 1, 1994  International Cargo Express was merged into Air Transport International, which was itself acquired by the Brink's Company in February 1998. ATI was sold in 2006 to Cargo Holdings International (CHI). It has 495 employees.

Cargo Aircraft Management was the lead customer for the Boeing 767 freighter conversion program. In the 12 months after ATI's sale by Brinks to CHI, worldwide airline profits fell significantly; however, ATI continued to negate this trend. Delivery of fully modernized and fuel efficient Boeing 767 was on track for June 2008.

On November 2, 2007, Cargo Holdings International, the parent company of ATI entered into an agreement to be acquired by Wilmington, OH-based ABX Holdings. The company along with sister company Capital Cargo International Airlines were run as separate companies under the Air Transport Services Group umbrella.

In March 2013 Capital Cargo merged with Air Transport.

In March 2016, Amazon.com announced that it would be using ATI to provide transport services for the Amazon Prime network.  The deal under ATI's parent company will result in an increase in aircraft, frequencies, and jobs for the airline. ATI has since become the primary carrier serving Amazon Air. ATI currently also operates military charters for the U.S. Transportation Command.

Fleet

Current fleet

The Air Transport International fleet includes the following aircraft (as of June 7, 2021):

Former fleet
Air Transport International formerly operated the following aicraft:

Accidents and incidents

Negligent in freight of macaques from China  
In an inspection report, the United States Department of Agriculture stated that Air Transport International had shipped 1,148 crab-eating macaques to Houston from the southern Chinese city of Guangzhou and failed to provide the animals with food and water for over 24 hours, in violation of the Animal Welfare Act. This was the second time Air Transport International had "run afoul of the law" for transporting animals from China for laboratory research.

See also 
 List of airlines of the United States

References

External links

 

Airlines based in Ohio
Airlines established in 1978
Cargo airlines of the United States
1978 establishments in the United States
American companies established in 1978